The 2nd South American Under-23 Championships in Athletics were held
in Buenos Aires, Argentina, at the Centro Nacional de Alto Rendimiento Deportivo (CeNARD) on November 10–12, 2006. The championships
were held as a part of the 2006 South American Games (ODESUR).  A detailed report on the results was given.

Participation
410 athletes from 11 countries participated in the event.  However, an unofficial count through the result lists resulted only in 266 participating athletes:

 (55)
 (6)
 (65)
 (35)
 (35)
 (17)
 (1)
 (9)
 (11)
 (6)
 (26)

Medal summary

Medal winners are published.
Detailed results can be found on the Fecodatle, on the CAU, on the CACAC website, on the CONSUDATLE website, and on the Tilastopaja website.

Men

Women

Medal table (unofficial)

The medal count was published.

* There is a mismatch between the unofficial medal count above
and the published medal count.  This is explained by the fact
that the source reports that in the women's 20 km race walk
competition, Magaly Andrade from Ecuador won the silver medal and Luz Villamarín from Colombia won bronze.  However, all other sources and
a special report on the race walking competitions list Luz Villamarín second and Magaly Andrade third.

Team trophies

The placing tables for team trophy (overall team, men and women categories) were published.

Total

Male

Female

References

South American Under-23 Championships in Athletics
2006 in Argentine sport
South American U23 Championships
 Sports competitions in Buenos Aires
International athletics competitions hosted by Argentina
2006 in South American sport
2006 in youth sport
November 2006 sports events in South America